Keep the Spirits Singing is an album by saxophonist David "Fathead" Newman recorded in 2000 and released on the HighNote label the following year.

Reception

In his review for AllMusic, Scott Yanow states "David "Fathead" Newman is in top form throughout this straight-ahead jazz set ... The music is mostly soulful hard bop and quite well played". In JazzTimes, Miles Jordan noted "This lively group gets off to a swinging start on the title track ... Besides tenor, Newman also plays flute on two tunes ... As might be expected from a Texas tenorman, Newman’s flute playing is as robust as his other axe(s), which also includes alto sax,".

Track listing 
 "Keep the Spirits Singing" (O'Donel Levy) – 6:22
 "Mellow-D for Mr. C" (Steve Turre) – 9:32
 "Cousin Esau" (David "Fathead" Newman) – 7:39
 "Karen My Love" (Newman) – 7:33
 "Willow Weep for Me" (Ann Ronell) – 7:43
 "Life" (John Hicks) – 7:53
 "Asia Beat" (Levy) – 5:29

Personnel 
David "Fathead" Newman – tenor saxophone, alto saxophone, flute
Steve Turre – trombone (tracks 1, 2 & 7)
John Hicks – piano 
Steve Novosel – bass 
Winard Harper – drums
Steve Kroon – percussion (tracks 1, 2 & 7)

References 

David "Fathead" Newman albums
2001 albums
HighNote Records albums